Haucourt is a commune in the Pas-de-Calais department in the Hauts-de-France region of France.

Geography

Population

Places of interest
 The Commonwealth War Graves Commission cemetery, which contains 97  known burials of the First World War, roughly 25 unknown burials and a memorial to 4 men who are believed to be buried in the cemetery.
 The church of St.Michel, rebuilt, as was the entire village, after World War I.

See also
Vis-en-Artois British Cemetery, Haucourt
Communes of the Pas-de-Calais department

References

External links

 The CWGC website about the cemetery at Haucourt

Communes of Pas-de-Calais